Matt Adamson (born 14 August 1972 in Taree, New South Wales) is an Australian former professional rugby league footballer who played in the 1990s and 2000s. A New South Wales State of Origin and Australian international representative  (under the Super League banner), he played club football in Australia with the Parramatta Eels, Penrith Panthers and Canberra Raiders, and in England with Leeds.

Career
A 6'5" (195 cm) tall fullback or winger in the early years of his career, Adamson was reportedly the second tallest fullback in top level rugby league history in Australia, second only to former Brisbane, Queensland, and Australian fullback Paul Hauff who stands 6'6" (197 cm). Adamson has been joined as the second tallest fullback in history by current South Sydney player Greg Inglis who is also 6'5" tall.

Adamson, who had signed with Super League in 1995 along with the rest of the Penrith Panthers and the club itself, made his test début from the bench for Australia in the inaugural ANZAC Test against New Zealand in 1997, won 34–22 by Australia at the Sydney Football Stadium. He was then selected in the second row for the end of season test against the Kiwis at the North Harbour Stadium in Auckland, won 30–12 by the Kiwis.

Following the test in Auckland, Adamson was selected to play for Australia in all three matches of the Super League Test series against Great Britain in England. He was selected in the second row for the first test at London's famous Wembley Stadium which saw Australia win 38–14. He kept his place in the side for the second test at Old Trafford, won 20–12 by the Lions, and was relegated to the bench for the deciding test at Elland Road in Leeds as the Australian's wrapped up the series with a 37–20 win. While the games are regarded as full test matches by the Rugby League International Federation, the Australian Rugby League refuse to acknowledge the tests played under the Super League due to the Super League war, and in their official records the games are not recorded.

Adamson made his State of Origin début from the bench for NSW in Game 2 of the 2001 State of Origin series at the Telstra Stadium in Sydney. He was again selected from the bench for the third and deciding game of the series at Brisbane's Suncorp Stadium in what would be his final representative game.

After 10 seasons playing in Australia with Parramatta (1991) and Penrith (1993–2001), Adamson signed to play with English Super League team Leeds Rhinos following the 2001 NRL season. He would spend three seasons with Leeds before returning to Australia to play for the Canberra Raiders in 2005.

Matt Adamson retired from playing at the end of the 2005 season. He played 1 game for Parramatta, 157 games for Penrith, 62 for Leeds and 16 for Canberra.

Post Playing
Adamson worked as an assistant coach to Matthew Elliott at Penrith Panthers during 2007 and 2008 but was sacked at the end of the 2008 season as part of a coaching "restructure."

Matt Adamson has worked a commentator for Fox Sports in their telecasts of the National Rugby League.

Appointed as the Melbourne Storm under 20's coach for the 2014 season. In 2015, he was appointed by the Melbourne Storm as their Queensland Coaching Director. The role saw him overseeing both feeder clubs Easts Tigers & Sunshine Coast Falcons.

Matt coach the Fiji national side for one game v Papua New Guinea on 23 June 2018 which Fiji lost 26-14 in Campbelltown Stadium, NSW.

Career highlights
 First-grade début: 26 July 1991 – Round 18 Parramatta Eels vs North Sydney at Parramatta Stadium

Footnotes

External links
NRL profile
(archived by web.archive.org) Profile at leedsrugby

1972 births
Living people
Australia national rugby league team players
Australian rugby league players
Canberra Raiders players
Fiji national rugby league team coaches
Leeds Rhinos players
New South Wales Rugby League State of Origin players
United Australia Party (2013) politicians
Parramatta Eels players
Penrith Panthers players
Rugby league fullbacks
Rugby league players from Taree
Rugby league second-rows
Rugby league wingers